The Fish River is a  river in northern Maine in the United States. It is a tributary of the Saint John River, which flows to the Bay of Fundy (an arm of the Atlantic Ocean) in New Brunswick, Canada.

From its start at the confluence of Fox Brook and Carr Pond Stream, in Maine Township 13, Range 8, WELS, the river runs north to Fish River Lake, then east to Portage Lake. It then runs northwards through St. Froid Lake and Eagle Lake to the Saint John River at Fort Kent. The latter section is roughly parallel to Maine State Route 11.

Fish River Lake

Fish River Lake is on the border of range 8 townships 13 and 14. Tributaries Smith Brook and Chase Brook flow into the west side of the lake from township 14, range 9. Fish River overflows the north end of the lake into Round Pond and then  to Portage Lake.

Portage Lake

Portage Lake is entirely within the town of Portage Lake. Fish River enters the western end of the lake near the western edge of town and overflows the northern end of the lake near the northern edge of town. Tributary Mosquito Brook flows  from township 14, range 7, into the northern part of the lake. The Bangor and Aroostook Railroad approaches from the south and runs along the eastern shore of the lake to follow the Fish River from Portage Lake all the way downstream to Fort Kent.

Saint Froid Lake

Saint Froid Lake is almost entirely in Winterville Plantation. Tributary Red River flows  from Pushineer Pond, Deboullie Pond, Gardner Pond, Galilee Pond, Denny Pond, Black Pond, Island Pond, Upper Pond, and Stink Pond in township 15, range 9, into the west side of Saint Froid Lake. The railroad follows the eastern shore of Saint Froid Lake and the western shore of Eagle Lake through the town of Eagle Lake and then follows the Fish River  into Fort Kent.

See also
List of rivers of Maine

References

Maine Streamflow Data from the USGS
Maine Watershed Data From Environmental Protection Agency

Lakes of Aroostook County, Maine
Tributaries of the Saint John River (Bay of Fundy)
North Maine Woods
Rivers of Maine
Lakes of Maine